Tihanna Vorster (born 28 March 1985) is a retired South African sprinter who specialized in the 400 metres.

She competed in the 4 × 400 metres relay at the 2004 World Junior Championships, but the team was disqualified. The South African team fared better at the 2007 All-Africa Games where Vorster helped win the silver medal. She competed individually at the 2008 African Championships without reaching the final.

Her personal best time was 54.12 seconds, achieved in April 2003 in Durban.

References

1985 births
Living people
South African female sprinters
African Games silver medalists for South Africa
African Games medalists in athletics (track and field)
Athletes (track and field) at the 2007 All-Africa Games
20th-century South African women
21st-century South African women